Polly Mooney Bennett (1922–2003) was an American artist. She is associated with the Gee's Bend quilting collective and was a member of the Freedom Quilting Bee. Her work has been exhibited in the Museum of Fine Arts, Houston.

Biography 
Daughter of Mary and Minniefield Mooney, Polly Mooney Bennett was raised in Gee's Bend, Alabama. Her parents separated in 1928.  She found work nursing and cooking for various white families in the area.  She married her husband, Mark Bennett in 1946. They maintained a farm on Rehoboth Rd. for the remainder of their lives.
Bennett began quilting under her mother's instruction at about eight years old. She recalls struggling at first, "...back then what I made be so much longer on one side than the other. I didn't start getting them exactly right for a long while." She completed her first quilts at 15 years old and is now regarded as one of the most precise quilt makers in the Soul's Grown Deep Foundation's Collection.

References 

1922 births
2003 deaths
20th-century African-American artists
20th-century African-American women
20th-century African-American people
21st-century African-American women
21st-century African-American people
Quilters
African-American women artists
20th-century American women artists
Artists from Alabama